Moonshot: The Flight of Apollo 11 is a 2009 children's picturebook by Brian Floca about the Apollo 11 spaceflight to the Moon. It was published by Atheneum Books for Young Readers.

Reception
Common Sense Media, in a review of Moonshot, wrote "Author-illustrator Brian Floca combines gripping narrative with a wealth of detail to deliver a beautifully poetic treatment of Apollo 11." and "This would be a treat to read with adults who remember Apollo 11." School Library Journal called it "stirring account" and The Horn Book Magazine wrote "Floca distills all of his gathered knowledge into a concise text, selecting the exact details to transform science into relatable experience".

Moonshot has also been reviewed by Library Media Connection magazine, BookPage, Booklist, the National Space Society, Kirkus Reviews, Publishers Weekly

Awards
Moonshot has received numerous awards including:

2009 Horn Book Fanfare Book - Nonfiction
2010 Children's Choice Fifth Grade to Sixth Grade Book of the Year - finalist 
2010 ALA Notable Children's Book - All Ages 
2010 Robert F. Sibert Medal - Honor 
2010 Flora Stieglitz Straus Award - winner (joint)

References

2009 children's books
American picture books
Children's history books
American history books
Apollo 11
Spaceflight books
Atheneum Books books